150 North Riverside Plaza is a highrise building in Chicago, Illinois, completed in 2017 and anchored by William Blair and Co. The building is 54 stories tall. The building occupies a two-acre site on the west bank of the Chicago River, whose size and location demanded an unusually small base for the building. The building features  of leasable office space. Due to its unique superstructure design, it encompasses just 25 percent of the lot.  In 2019, the building was given the Chicago Chapter of the American Institute of Architects' highest award for design excellence.

Among the building's tenants is the Hyatt Corporation, who moved their headquarters to the building upon its completion.

Background
As required by the city of Chicago for any new riverfront building, the developer was required to set aside part of the lot size for public park space; 75 percent of the project site is reserved for a public park, amphitheater, and riverwalk. The site is built with air rights over tracks that carry Metra and Amtrak trains into Chicago Union Station. 
The building has achieved LEED gold and WiredScore Platinum certification.

Design

The architect's intention is to connect the interior and exterior visually.

One signature aspect of 150 North Riverside building is the way the office floors cantilever out from the central core. The building is constructed with a smaller base for a height of 8 stories (104 ft), but the building cantilevers out to the full size of the office floor space. This gives it a slenderness ratio of 1:20 at its base.

Structural Engineer of Record: Magnusson Klemencic Associates.

150 Media Stream
Located in the lobby of 150 N Riverside, the 150 Media Stream is a public media art installation divided into 89 LED blades. It stretches over 150 feet long and reaches 22 feet high, the largest structure of its kind in the city. Launched in 2017, the 150 Media Stream showcases commissioned work by emerging and renowned local and international media artists. The 150 Media Stream Arts Program also includes strategic partnerships with many major cultural institutions and university fine arts programs in the city and provides a forum to exhibit and promote their work in a dynamic environment of arts and business.

Reception
Variously referred to by popular names like "The Tuning Fork", "The Champagne Flute", or "The Guillotine", the building has become a highlight of architectural boat tours.  Architecture critic Blair Kamin in his positive review calls it "a persuasive blend of the pragmatic and dramatic."

The building is one of the most-awarded towers in Chicago, receiving national and international acclaim:

 2018 3rd place, Emporis Global Skyscraper Awards
 2017 Chicago Innovation Award
 2017 Commercial Development of the Year, Chicago Commercial Real Estate Awards (CCREA)
 2016 Office Development of the Year, NAIOP Chicago Chapter
 2017 Developer of the Year, Chicago Commercial Real Estate Awards (CCREA)
 2017 National Grand Award, American Council of Engineering Companies
 2018 National ‘Award of Excellence’, Best Tall Building Category, Council on Tall Buildings & Urban Habitats
 2018 Vision Award, Bold Design Solution, Urban Land Institute
 2018 Best Office Development & Architecture for Americas, International Property Awards
 2016 Jurors’ Favorite/Most Innovative, Structural Engineers Association of Illinois
 2017 Top Building Team (Platinum Award), Building Design & Construction magazine
 2017 Best Office/Retail/Mixed-Use Project, ENR Midwest
 2017 Best Overall Project, ENR Midwest
 2018 National Award, Innovative Design in Engineering and Architecture with Structural Steel (IDEAS2), American Institute of Steel Construction
 2018 Global Finalist, Best Office Building, MIPIM Global Real Estate Awards
 2018 Build Americas Award – National Project of the Year, American Contractors Association
 2017 Top 10 Global Skyscrapers, Dezeen Magazine
 2018 Best New Event Space, Crain's Chicago Business
 2017 Best New Office Tower, Chicago Magazine
 2017 Best Architecture of the Year, Chicago Tribune

See also
List of tallest buildings in Chicago

External links
Chicago Architecture.info page 
Official building website
Official 150 Media Stream website

References

Skyscraper office buildings in Chicago
Office buildings completed in 2017
2017 establishments in Illinois